Events from the year 1952 in South Korea.

Incumbents
President: Rhee Syng-man 
Vice President: Kim Seong-su (until 29 May), Ham Tae-young (starting 15 June)
Prime Minister:
 until 24 April: Chang Myon 
 24 April-6 May: Yi Yun-yong
 starting 6 May: Chang Taek-sang

Events
October 28 – Korea Explosives, as predecessor of Hanhwa Group was founded.

Births
January 1st -Ahn Sung-ki
January 5th-Jang Gwang
February 2nd - Park Geun-hye
May 8th-Lee Deok-hwa
May 16th-Lee Kye-in
June 18th-Lee Soo-man, South Korean record producer, best known as the founder of SM Entertainment,
August 13th-Yang Hee-eun, South Korean singer
October 5th-Jo O-ryeon, known for swimming the Korea Strait in 1980.
October 31st-Im Ha-ryong
Il Lee

See also
List of South Korean films of 1952
Years in Japan
Years in North Korea

References

 
South Korea
Years of the 20th century in South Korea
1950s in South Korea
South Korea